The English Terrace (Danish: De Engelske Rækkehuse) at Toldbodgade 71– 87 is a row of consecutive terraced houses in the Frederiksstaden neighbourhood of central Copenhagen, Denmark. The terrace was built in 1873–74 to design by Vilhelm Tvede for Det Classenske Fideicommis. It is listed.

History

Background
The Jan von Osten House at Amaliegade was purchased by Johan Frederik Classen in 1770. After his death in 1792, the property was taken over by Det Classenske Fideicommis.

The English Terrace
In the early 1870s, the foundation charged Vilhelm Tvede with the design of a residential project for the garden. He designed a single row of terraced houses inspired by English architecture. It was built in 1873–74. The houses were originally rented out but were sold off individually in the 1970s. Former residents include the architect Hans Munk Hansen.

The individual houses have later been sold as condominiums. They were originally fronted by small front gardens and a small shed building towatrds Toldbodgade. These have disappeared in conjunction with an widening of the street.

Gallery

Architecture
 

The terrace consists of nine terraced houses. The main entrances face a courtyard situated between the terrace to the east and the Jan van Osten House to the west. Rach house has an area of approximately 400 square metres and consist of three storeys, attic and basement.

The houses were listed in 1978. The scope of the heritage listing was expanded in 2002 to include the pavement and granite curb in the courtyard.

Image gallery

References

External links

 Renderings in the Danish National Art Library

Houses in Copenhagen
Listed residential buildings in Copenhagen
Frederiksstaden